Zoid may refer to:

 Zoids; reproductive cells that possess one or more flagella, and are capable of independent movement.
 Zoids; fictional mecha created by TOMY that form the basis of a toy and anime franchise.
 One of two characters from Futurama:
 Doctor Zoidberg; a lobster-like alien and one of the main characters.
 Harold Zoid; Zoidberg's uncle, appearing only in the episode That's Lobstertainment!
 Karen Zoid, a South African rock singer, guitarist and songwriter

See also

 
 
 
 zooid, a component animal of a colonial animal